The Duchesses of Holstein-Sønderborg were the consorts of the rulers of Schleswig-Holstein-Sonderborg and it many branches.  Only one branch, the House of Schleswig-Holstein-Sonderborg-Glücksburg, survive today but the current Glücksburg duchess hold the higher title of Duchess consort of Schleswig and Holstein

Duchess of consort Schleswig-Holstein-Sonderburg, 1544–1668

Duchess consort Schleswig-Holstein-Sonderburg-Franzhagen, 1688–1708

Duchess consort Schleswig-Holstein-Sonderburg-Augustenburg, 1647–1931

Duchess consort Schleswig-Holstein-Sonderburg-Beck, 1647–1825

Duchess consort of Schleswig-Holstein-Sonderburg-Glücksburg, 1825–present

Duchess consort Schleswig-Holstein-Sonderburg-Wiesenburg, 1647–1744

Duchess consort Schleswig-Holstein-Sonderburg-Norburg, 1622–1669

Duchess consort Schleswig-Holstein-Sonderburg-Glücksburg, 1622–?

Duchess consort Schleswig-Holstein-Sonderburg-Plön, 1622–1766

Duchess consort Schleswig-Holstein-Sonderburg-Plön-Rethwisch, ?–1729

Duchess consort Schleswig-Holstein-Sonderburg-Norburg, 1679–1729

Notes

See also
 List of consorts of Schleswig and Holstein
 List of Russian consorts
 List of Danish consorts
 List of consorts of Oldenburg
 List of Norwegian queens
 List of Finnish consorts
 List of Swedish consorts

 
Sonderborg, Consort of